FM Santa Rosa is a local catholic radio station broadcasting from the city of Pilar, Buenos Aires Province, Buenos Aires, Argentina. It broadcasts newsmagazines, music and some religious shows from EWTN. Its call letters are LRI 419.

Programming
Air times are according to Argentina's time zone (UTC -3).

Weekdays
Con algo al aire ("With something on the air", 9-10am) Diego Torres.
El magazine de la mañana ("Morning magazine", 10-11am) Víctor Cáceres.
Días de radio ("Days of radio", 11-1pm) Freddy Aguirre.
El magazine de la tarde ("Afternoon magazine", 5-6pm) Víctor Cáceres.

Saturdays
Los retro hits de la 90.3 ("90.3's retro hits", 6am-9pm and 11pm-6am)
Dance floor (9-11pm)

Sundays
Los retro hits de la 90.3 ("90.3's retro hits", 6-10am)
Sunday Mass (10-11am)

Radio stations in Argentina
Catholic radio stations
Mass media in Pilar, Buenos Aires